Joel Goodman is an American film composer, music business entrepreneur and educator.

His work has appeared at every major film festival in the world and includes scores to films and television programs that have received 5 Oscar nominations, 20 Emmy awards and over 30 Emmy nominations. Prior to scoring films, Goodman composed music for advertising and produced records, including those for Chuck Mangione, Livingston Taylor and Carla Lother. In 1999, he founded the record label Museum Music and in 2002 co-founded the music licensing and publishing company MusicBox. Goodman conducts university master classes in the US and Europe, is a regular panelist for such organizations as ASCAP, IFP, AFI and SCL amongst others, and currently serves on the board of the Production Music Association, where he is the Chairman of the Performing Rights Committee.

Early life
Goodman was born in Brooklyn, NY and grew up in Queens, where he learned to play his first instrument (the trumpet) from the legendary public school music educator Allen Stier. He attended high school in Manhattan at The High School of Music & Art, studying jazz with Justin DiCioccio and orchestral performance with Sydney Baker while taking private bass lessons from Rich Samalin and Ken Smith. As a result, Goodman played trumpet in the orchestra, and wrote arrangements and played bass for his high school jazz band. Some notable classmates of Goodman's include Charley Drayton, Bernard Wright, Sterling Campbell, Tony Mangurian, Larry Aberman, Erik Sanko, Eric Rosenberg, Roey Shamir and Marcus Rojas.

Berklee College of Music
Goodman attended the Berklee College of Music as a double major focusing on both bass performance and jazz composition and arranging. This gave him the opportunity to study with such greats as Herb Pomeroy, Michael Gibbs, Bob Freedman, John LaPorta, Gary Burton, John Abercrombie, Jerry Bergonzi, Steve Swallow and Bruce Gertz.

It was during this time that Goodman joined the jazz/world/fusion band Ananda founded by composer and guitarist Claudio Ragazzi. Their first album, titled Amazonia, was recorded for the record label Sonic Atmospheres and was produced by Craig Huxley. The band toured regularly in the Northeastern United States and occasionally included appearances by Ralph Towner as a member of the live band.

Early career
After graduating from Berklee in 1984, Goodman moved back to New York City and began his music career as a live and studio session bassist. In 1991 he became a staff composer for the music production house North Forty Music where he composed music for hundreds of major national television advertisements including those for American Express, Budweiser, IBM, Gatorade and Procter & Gamble. Goodman worked at North Forty Music until 1999, when he left to pursue composing for film full-time.

Record producer
Beginning in 1996, Goodman produced 4 records for the acclaimed audiophile record label Chesky Records.

Composer for film
Goodman's first score, for a documentary film called My Knees Were Jumping, came about by a chance meeting with an old high school friend on the streets of New York City. The film premiered at the Sundance Film Festival in 1996 and opened the door for many more film scoring opportunities to come.

While the music was being mixed into the film prior to its release, another film producer in the studio next door came in to inquire about the music, and this ultimately led to Goodman's next scoring project. Green Chimneys premiered at the Sundance Film Festival the following year. When the editor from Green Chimneys was hired to edit the Albert Maysles film Concert of Wills: Building the Getty Center, Goodman was asked to provide the music - an opportunity that played an important role in his subsequent founding of Museum Music.

Goodman has since gone on to score over 100 films, and has collaborated with many distinguished directors and producers including Wong Kar-wai, Kevin Spacey, Albert Maysles, Andrew Jarecki, Barbara Kopple, Mark Zwonitzer, Michael Epstein, Oren Jacoby, Irene Taylor Brodsky, Marshall Curry, Sebastian Junger and Fisher Stevens.

In 2012, Goodman received an Emmy Award in recognition of his score to the film Saving Pelican #895. The award was presented as part of the 33rd Annual News & Documentary Emmy Awards in the category of Outstanding Individual Achievement in a Craft: Music & Sound.

Documentary film scoring credits (partial list)

Narrative film scoring credits (partial list)

Museum Music
In 1999, Goodman founded the record label Museum Music that specializes in creating custom music CDs for museums and related cultural organizations. That year, New York's Museum of Modern Art was hosting a Jackson Pollock exhibition. The museum was looking to create a compilation CD of music to accompany the exhibition, and Goodman was contacted as music consultant. Seeing a unique opportunity, Goodman successfully pitched MoMA to create the compilation himself, and thus Museum Music was born. "Jackson Pollock Jazz" featured music licensed directly from the artist's personal collection, and was an immediate success. Shortly after, Museum Music landed business with the J. Paul Getty Museum in Los Angeles, which was preparing for its grand opening at the time, and has since grown to service dozens of major cultural institutions around the world.

Music publishing
In 2002 Goodman and longtime college friend Daniel Stein founded the music licensing and publishing company MusicBox. Under Goodman's leadership, the company licensed and produced custom music for all types of visual media, ultimately growing to include 24 catalogs and over 30,000 songs with representation in more than 45 countries worldwide. Ole Music Publishing, one of the largest independent music publishers in the world, acquired MusicBox in 2011.

Education and advocacy
Goodman strongly supports and advocates for the fair and just valuation of music. As a board member of the Production Music Association and chair of its Performing Rights Committee, Goodman works to educate the membership on best practices for effectively valuing and exploiting their copyrights in today's evolving music industry. He is a regular panelist for such organizations as ASCAP, IFP, AFI and SCL, providing insight and expertise on these same issues, and has served as an ASCAP industry representative in meetings with members of the U.S. Congress, advocating for the rights of artists.

In addition, Goodman leads film music workshops at universities, conferences and film festivals around the world, encouraging the creative process and guiding both students and peers on effective methods for creative collaboration between composers and filmmakers.

Cycling
Goodman is an active cyclist and fan of cycling. He rides over 7,500 miles a year, has ridden the entire length of the California coast twice, and has ridden across the United States from Canada to Mexico.

See also
 Walt Disney (2015 PBS film)

References

External links 
 Official Website
 

American film score composers
American male film score composers
Living people
The High School of Music & Art alumni
Berklee College of Music alumni
Year of birth missing (living people)